MontaVista Software is a company that develops embedded Linux system software, development tools, and related software. Its products are made for other corporations developing embedded systems such as automotive electronics, communications equipment, mobile phones, and other electronic devices and infrastructure.

MontaVista is based in Santa Clara, California and was founded in 1999 by James "Jim" Ready (formerly at Mentor Graphics and creator of Versatile Real-Time Executive (VRTX)) and others. On November 10, 2009 Cavium Networks announced that it had signed a definitive agreement to purchase MontaVista for $50 million. After Cavium got acquired by Marvell, Montavista operated as an independent entity.

Products

Linux
May 12, 2009, MontaVista announced MontaVista Linux 6 (MVL6) comprising Market Specific Distributions, MontaVista Integration Platform, Software Development Kit, MontaVista Zone Content Server, and support and services. There are several differences between MVL6 and prior MontaVista Linux products. The main ones are:

 Market Specific Distributions (MSD)Linux operating systems (kernel + userland) optimized for each specific semiconductor vendor's hardware.
 MontaVista Integration Platformbased on BitBake, analogous to make, which analyzes a set of directives and then builds a task dependency tree to satisfy a user command. BitBake then executes the defined tasks to completion.
 MontaVista Zone Content Serveraccessed from behind a proxy server, or local web mirror for offline operations, to fetch software and updates. Rather than depending on a mix of public HTTP, Concurrent Versions System (CVS), Git, and Subversion servers across the Internet, there is one source for each original source archive and patch.

MontaVista Linux (formerly named Hard Hat Linux) is a Linux distribution that has been enhanced to become a full real-time operating system. The work on real-time performance has since continued to a point where MontaVista claims to support hard real-time tasks on embedded Linux as of MontaVista Linux 4.0, with response times as fast as other real-time operating systems.

MontaVista sells subscriptions, which consist of software, documentation, and technical support. The software includes a Linux kernel and toolchain aimed at a specific hardware configuration, collectively called a Linux Support Package (LSP), and other integrated tools including the Eclipse-based DevRocket integrated development environment (IDE). The distribution is available in three editions, each aimed at different market segments: Professional Edition, Carrier Grade Edition, and Mobilinux. The MontaVista Linux toolkit includes specific code libraries to easily migrate from Wind River Systems' VxWorks and the pSOS operating systems.

OpenCGX 
Project OpenCGX is an open and free to use embedded Linux distribution from MontaVista Software LLC. OpenCGX is based on MontaVista’s eleventh generation Carrier Grade Linux. Engineers can quickly jumpstart their ARM and x86 development with a full embedded Linux distribution that is easily customizable. OpenCGX in its introduction is based on Yocto 2.4 with Linux Kernel 4.14 (or latest LTS kernel) and GNU 7.2 toolchain.

Carrier Grade Express (CGX) 
MontaVista Linux Carrier Grade eXpress (CGX) is MontaVista's main operating system product that delivers Carrier Grade reliability, security, and serviceability in a highly configurable, flexible package with consistent high quality. CGX features address a large embedded device segment including networking and communications, instrumentation and control, aerospace and defense, SOHO devices, medical electronics and the "Internet of Things (IoT)" market besides general embedded devices. CGX is a Carrier Grade distribution, validated for CGL spec version 5.0.

MVShield 
MVShield is MontaVista's professional maintenance and support program available for Carrier-Grade Linux products and other distributions such as CentOS or Yocto. One of MontaVista’s most popular support program has been MVShield for CentOS, that is best suited for customers who utilize CentOS in markets like network and wireless infrastructure, medical, and military-aerospace. MVShield for Yocto is MontaVista’s professional services offering to support customer’s open-source Yocto baselines to allow access to industry-leading support and maintenance services without any migration effort to commercial Linux baselines.

Carrier Grade Edition
MontaVista Linux Carrier Grade Edition (CGE) is a commercial-grade Linux development platform for developers working with reliability, availability, and serviceability (RAS) managed hardware (Hardware Platform Interface (HPI), Intelligent Platform Management Interface (IPMI)) or custom hardware, who need long-term support and high availability.
Carrier Grade Linux is governed by the Linux Foundation CGL working group.

DevRocket
MontaVista DevRocket is a set of Eclipse plug-ins for facilitating application and system development with MontaVista Linux. DevRocket integrated development environment (IDE) runs on Linux, Solaris and Windows. It uses the Eclipse C++ Development Toolkit (CDT). Starting with DevRocket 5.0, users can add MontaVista's plug-ins into an existing Eclipse installation, or install Eclipse with the plugins already loaded.

DevRocket is available in two varieties: a Platform Developer Kit (PDK) and Application Developer Kit (ADK). The Platform Developer Kit includes the ability to communicate with a target (RSE, SSH), create and manage file systems, debugging (kgdb), and performance tuning (memory leak, memory use, system profiling). The application developer kit includes a virtual target for developing applications earlier in the development cycle, one-click edit/compile/debug, and performance tuning.

Services

Custom Hardware Enablement 
MontaVista supports the x86, ARM, MIPS, and PowerPC architectures with Board Support Packages (BSPs) and associated kernel, driver, and user land adaptions on SoC or third party reference hardware boards. However, most companies develop and then ship their products based on custom hardware created for their specific requirements. MontaVista can adapt MontaVista Linux products to fit customers' software and hardware environment.

RTOS/Legacy Migration 
MontaVista's RTOS/Legacy Migration services helps developing teams move from legacy products using a home grown or commercial real-time operating system (RTOS) to Embedded Linux.

System Certification 
MontaVista Linux is being used in applications within IT and telecom that need to be certified according to Common Criteria, up to EAL4+ level. Evaluation Assurance Level 4+ (EAL4+) is commonly used to  secure connectivity in  critical environments, such as fire and police departments, or aviation and industry control systems. With the help of EAL4+ these critical environments can, for example, ensure secure and safe phone calls, control communication in-flight and for the assembly line, and achieve secure internet access.

Training 
MontaVista customer education provides education and training in developing intelligent device applications using MontaVista Linux. With the skills gained, development teams are able to reduce application development cycles while minimizing development risk.

Legacy products 
Several legacy products are available from MontaVista under long-term support agreements.

Mobilinux 
MontaVista Mobilinux is for wireless handsets and other mobile devices such as Global Positioning System (GPS) devices, portable medical devices, and wireless POS terminals. Mobilinux's key features include dynamic power management, real-time performance, fast booting, and small memory footprint.

Professional Edition
MontaVista Professional Edition (Pro) is for general embedded Linux developers who want all the benefits of an open source development platform (open source, Linux, easily accessible software, etc.) and added MontaVista benefits including higher quality (fewer bugs), integration with open source tools for a given hardware architecture, and support. Pro is for intelligent device markets, including networking and communications, instrumentation and control, aerospace and defense, small office/home office (SOHO) devices, and medical devices. Future development of MontaVista Pro has been folded into MontaVista Linux, effectively ending this as a separate edition starting version 5.0.24.

Open source contributions
MontaVista has a history of being a major contributor to the Linux kernel and the open source community. From the start, Jim Ready said he wanted to make it "100% pure Linux" under the GPL. The core changes to make MontaVista Linux into a real-time operating system were made by Nigel Gamble and later updated by Robert Love. Robert Love submitted the changes to the Linux kernel in 2001. The Linux 2.6 stable kernel series is the first to include similar features, such as priority-based preemption. As of 2008, MontaVista had contributed 1.2% of the Linux kernel, making it the 9th-largest corporate contributor to the Linux kernel, according to a survey by the Linux Foundation.

MontaVista has also spun off independent open source projects based on several of its features, including dynamic power management, high resolution POSIX timers, the pramfs file system, and the openais implementation of the Service Availability Forum's (SA Forum) Application Interface Specification.

Distribution

Other versions of MontaVista Linux are used in devices made by a number of partners, including Sony Bravia TVs, NEC routers, and others, especially in Japan. A version of MontaVista Linux OS is used in Dell Latitude E4200 and E4300 notebooks to provide the Latitude ON feature.

Cisco NX-OS is based on HardHat Linux.

Mobile phones
Motorola became the first company to use Linux on a mobile phone when it released the Motorola A760 to the Chinese market on February 16, 2003. Motorola chose to use MontaVista Linux in the Motorola A760 and future Linux-based phones, despite the fact that Motorola was a founding member of the competing Symbian OS. Since then, Motorola has increased focus on its Linux platform and publicly stated that the future platform for all its mid- and high-tier mobile phones will be Linux with Java, and other phone manufacturers NEC and Panasonic have developed a common platform based on MontaVista Linux.

See also
 Green Hills Software
 LynuxWorks
 Versatile Real-Time Executive (VRTX)
TimeSys
Cavium Networks

References

External links
 

Linux companies
Embedded Linux
Software companies based in California
Companies based in Santa Clara, California
Software companies established in 1999
Embedded Linux distributions
Software companies of the United States
1999 establishments in California
1999 establishments in the United States
Companies established in 1999